The 1941 Gloria Fault earthquake occurred at 18:03:57 UTC in the northern Atlantic Ocean on 25 November 1941. It had a magnitude of about 8.0 on the moment magnitude scale and a maximum perceived intensity of IX (Violent) on the Mercalli intensity scale. It was caused by movement on the Gloria Fault, part of the Azores–Gibraltar Transform Fault. It triggered a small tsunami, which was observed at Newlyn, Cornwall.

See also
List of earthquakes in 1941

References

External links

1941 earthquakes
1941 tsunamis